Thiaucourt-Regniéville is a commune in the Meurthe-et-Moselle department in north-eastern France.

Geography
The Rupt de Mad flows northeastward through the north-western part of the commune and crosses the village.

Sights
The St. Mihiel American Cemetery and Memorial
The German war cemetery, where rest more than 11,000 German soldiers from World War I and some French soldiers.

See also
Communes of the Meurthe-et-Moselle department
Parc naturel régional de Lorraine

References

Communes of Meurthe-et-Moselle
World War I cemeteries in France